Owen de la Pole (c. 1257 – c. 1293), also known as Owain ap Gruffydd ap Gwenwynwyn, was the heir presumptive to the Welsh principality of Powys Wenwynwyn until 1283 when it was abolished by the Parliament of Shrewsbury. He became the 1st Lord of Powis after the death of his father Gruffydd ap Gwenwynwyn c. 1287.  He is not related to the English de la Pole family descended from William de la Pole, Chief Baron of the Exchequer in the following century, later Earls and Dukes of Suffolk.

Owen was born in England sometime after his father was driven into exile there in 1257 by Llywelyn ap Gruffudd the ruler of Kingdom of Gwynedd. It was during this exile that his father probably adopted the surname de la Pole meaning "of the Pool" and referring to the old name for Welshpool which had become his family's capital. In 1263 following the Treaty of Montgomery his father was restored to some of his lands in return for agreeing to pay homage to Llywelyn as Prince of Wales. However, good relations between Powys Wenwynwyn and Gwynedd were short-lived as Owen and his father were soon implicated in an assassination attempt on the Prince of Wales in 1274. This led to Owen and his father fleeing to Shrewsbury where they both led border raids against the Principality of Wales on behalf of the English crown.

Following Llywelyn's defeat at the hands of Edward I of England in 1277 Owen returned to Wales alongside his father whose lands had been restored. They soon became embroiled in a border dispute with Llywelyn which was one of the catalysts for a renewed campaign by the princes of Gwynedd against English domination. In 1284, following the Conquest of Wales by Edward I, the de la Pole family surrendered their princely pretensions, but received back their principality in "free barony" as the marcher lordship of Powys.

Owen's father Gruffydd died around 1286. In 1290, Owen endowed his four younger brothers with portions of the lordship, which were to be held for him as his feudal tenants.  Two brothers (who were priests) received their portions for life, the shares of the other two were to revert to Owen on failure of issue.  Only William left children and they enjoyed the Lordship of Mawddwy and the majority of Mallwyd for several generations, before it was divided between coheirs in the early 16th century. One of the coheiresses was Elisabeth de Burgh, who married Sir John Lingen (d. 1505), and left descendants from this princely house.

Owen married Joan Corbet, the daughter of Robert Corbet and Catherine Le Strange; together they had a daughter and probably five sons:

 Griffith de la Pole, 2nd Lord of Powis, died childless in 1309.
 Hawise de la Pole, "The Lady of Powys" (Powys, 25 July 1290 – Grey Friars, 1349); inherited the lordship in 1309. She married John Charleton, 1st Baron Cherleton, (1268–1353), and their descendants held the lordship until the late 16th century.

He lived the latter part of his life in Powys Castle in Welshpool and died c. 1293. After his death the lordship of Powis passed to his son Griffith, who died in childless in 1309, and then to his daughter Hawise and her descendants from her marriage to John Charleton, 1st Baron Cherleton.

References

1250s births
1290s deaths
Year of birth uncertain
Year of death uncertain
Marcher lords
House of Mathrafal
13th-century Welsh nobility
Burials in Shropshire